Godfrey Edward Charles Webb (30 June 1914 – October 2003) was a British author, and member of the Souls.  He wrote under the names Norman England, and Charles Godfrey.

Webb was born in London in 1914, and educated at Poole Grammar School.  He married Muriel Sybil Bath.  He worked in the Civil Service for Ordnance Survey.

References

1914 births
2003 deaths
British writers
People educated at Poole Grammar School
20th-century British civil servants